Emil Nielsen (born 10 March 1997) is a Danish handball player for FC Barcelona and the Danish national team.

He made his debut on the Danish national team on 5 April 2018. He represented Denmark at the 2021 World Men's Handball Championship.

Honours
 Danish Championship
 Winner: 2018
 Coupe de la Ligue
 Winner: 2021–22
 Supercopa Ibérica
 Winner: 2022
 Copa ASOBAL
 Winner: 2023
Individual awards
Best Goalkeeper of the European Men's U-18 Handball Championship: 2014

References

External links

1997 births
Living people
Danish male handball players
Sportspeople from Aarhus
Expatriate handball players
Danish expatriate sportspeople in France
Danish expatriate sportspeople in Spain
FC Barcelona Handbol players